Dunham-on-the-Hill is a village and former civil parish, now in the parish of Dunham-on-the-Hill and Hapsford, in the unitary authority of Cheshire West and Chester, and the ceremonial county of Cheshire, England.

Originally a small hamlet, it has gradually enlarged over the twentieth century, although the village retains a semi-rural character. Council housing was built shortly after the Second World War behind ‘The Wheatsheaf' pub, with many of these properties now owner occupied. Other in-fill building in the village has increased the population of the parish from fewer than 300 in the early 1900s to 534 recorded in the 2001 census.  This decreased slightly to 501 at the time of the 2011 census. The civil parish was abolished in 2015 to form Dunham-on-the-Hill and Hapsford, part also went to Manley.

History
The name Dunham-on-the-Hill means "hill village or homestead", deriving from the Old English dūn (a hill) and hām (a village, community or homestead).

The village is mentioned in the Domesday Book of 1086 as Doneham  
under the ownership of Earl Hugh of Chester. The entry lists eleven households (seven villagers, three smallholders and one 'smiths'). Comprising farmland, meadow and some woodland, Aescwulf of Landican had previously been the owner in 1066.

Dunham-on-the-Hill was a township in Thornton parish, Eddisbury Hundred, which became a civil parish in 1866. Its population was recorded as 260 in 1801, then 332 in 1851, 282 in 1901, 446 in 1951 and increasing to 534 by 2001.

Dunham Hill railway station opened in 1850 as part of the Birkenhead Railway. It closed in 1952, although the tracks passing through the station site are still operational as the Chester–Warrington line.

ROF Dunham on the Hill was an explosives storage depot built during World War II. The facility had its own on-site railway, with access provided via a branch line near the railway station. The depot closed during the 1960s and most of the land has been given over to agriculture.  Some of the old storage sheds can still be seen from the M56 motorway.

The village school closed in 2008. The 'Dunham Arms' pub reopened in 2010.

Churches
The parish church of St Luke was built in the 1860s as a chapel of ease. Before this villagers had to walk across the fields to Thornton-le-Moors in order to attend church services. Services are held here at 9.30 every Sunday morning.

The village also has two Methodist chapels, both now converted into dwellings. The Wesleyan Methodist church in the centre of Dunham was the first place of worship to be built in the village. Hapsford Methodist Church is on the A56 between Dunham and its neighbouring village, Hapsford.

See also

Listed buildings in Dunham on the Hill

References

External links

Villages in Cheshire
Former civil parishes in Cheshire
Cheshire West and Chester